Boris Lvovich Gutnikov (Russian: Борис Львович Гу́тников) (4 July 1931 in Vitebsk – 6 April 1986 in Leningrad) was a Soviet violinist, born in the Belorussian SSR.

He won the 1957 Long-Thibaud Competition and, most notably, the 1962 International Tchaikovsky Competition. He had been appointed a teacher at the Leningrad Conservatory soon before.

Andrei Petrov composed in 1987 his Memoria for violin and ensemble in memoriam Gutnikov.

References
 Voice of Russia - Musical tales of St. Petersburg
 Concours International Marguerite Long-Jacques Thibaud - 1957 Palmares
 Onno van Rijen's Soviet Composers webpage

1931 births
1986 deaths
Soviet classical violinists
Russian classical violinists
Male classical violinists
Prize-winners of the International Tchaikovsky Competition
Long-Thibaud-Crespin Competition prize-winners
People from Vitebsk
20th-century classical violinists
Burials at Serafimovskoe Cemetery
20th-century Russian male musicians